The men's BMX racing competition of the cycling events at the 2019 Pan American Games was held on August 8 and August 9 at the Circuito BMX.

Schedule

Results

Time Trials
23 riders from 14 countries was started

Quarterfinals
First 4 riders in each quarterfinal qualify to semifinal.

Quarterfinal 1

Quarterfinal 2

Quarterfinal 3

Quarterfinal 4

Semifinals
First 4 riders in each semifinal qualify to final.

Semifinal 1

Semifinal 2

Final

References

Cycling at the 2019 Pan American Games
BMX at the Pan American Games